Guangdong University of Technology (abbreviated as GDUT) is a provincial university in Guangdong, China. The university offers a range of courses in engineering, science, technology, management, liberal arts and law, with major emphasis on the study of engineering.

Guangdong University of Technology ranked 21st in the world for Nature Index 2021 Young Universities (Leading 150 Young Universities) and 76th in China for Nature Index 2022.

History  

Guangdong University of Technology was formerly known as Guangdong Institute of Technology. Approved by the State Education Commission in June 1995, it merged Guangdong Institute of Mechanical Engineering and the east campus of South China Institute of Architecture.

Guangdong Institute of Technology was found in 1952 and then merged Central South Institute of Science and Technology in 1961. During the Cultural Revolution, the campus was closed and the school was forced to move to Nanhua Temple in Shaoguan City. The school returned to the Guangzhou campus in 1982, but most of the campus had been destroyed.

Guangdong Institute of Mechanical Engineering was found in 1956 and also forced to close during the Cultural Revolution.

East Campus of South China Institute of Architecture was found in 1956.

Campus

HEMC Campus 
100 Waihuan Xi Road, Guangzhou Higher Education Mega Center. This campus accommodates most of the faculties (70%). Faculty of Foreign Language Studies, used to be located in Longdong Campus before 2011, now is located in Main Campus.

Dongfeng Road Campus  
It was the former campus of Guangdong Institute of Technology and was the main campus until the Guangzhou Higher Education Mega Centre opened in 2005. It is now the campus for the Faculty of Architecture and Urban Planning, Faculty of Art and Design, Faculty of Law and Faculty of Continuing Education.

Longdong Campus 
It was opened in 1999 as a campus for the first and second year undergraduate students. It is now the campus for the Faculty of Management and Faculty of Economics.

Panyu Campus 
Zhongcun Town, Panyu District. It is the campus for the Business School.

Shahe Campus 
It was the former campus of the east campus of the South China Institute of Architecture. It is now the campus for Science and Technology Park.

Jieyang Campus 
The Jieyang Campus is located at Huilai, Jieyang City, and covers an area of 1.32 square kilometers. The first batch of students started school there in September 2021.

Wushan Campus 
It was the former campus of Guangdong Institute of Mechanical Engineering, which was sold to Guangdong Teachers College of Foreign Language and Arts in 2006.

Library 

Its well-stocked library has a collection of over 1,600,000 books and 9,000 sets of electronic literature. (more than 2,840,000 books and 10,000 sets now in 2008).

Administration

Faculty 
It has the privilege to confer Doctor’s, Master’s, and bachelor's degrees on qualified students. At present the university has 5 doctoral degree programs, 31 master's degree programs (including MBA program), 52 bachelor's degree programs.(10 doctoral degree programs, 51 master's degree programs, including MBA program, and 57 bachelor's degree programs now in 2008)..

Rankings and reputation

Nature Index 
Nature Index tracks the affiliations of high-quality scientific articles and presents research outputs by institution and country on monthly basis.

International exchanges and cooperation 
It has played an active role in international scientific research and cultural cooperation and exchanges.

There are more than 50 universities, research institutions and companies abroad that have established academic exchange partnerships with it, including those in the United States, United Kingdom, Germany, France, Russia, Poland, Thailand, Australia and Hong Kong, Macao and Taiwan regions.

References

External links
Official website of Guangdong University of Technology
3D map of Guangdong University of Technology 

Universities and colleges in Guangzhou
Guangzhou Higher Education Mega Center
Educational institutions established in 1952
Educational institutions established in 1995
Technical universities and colleges in China
1952 establishments in China